Stefano Travisani (born 16 September 1985) is an Italian paralympic archer who won a silver medal at the 2020 Summer Paralympics.

References

External links
 Stefano Travisani at Italian National Olympic Committee

1985 births
Living people
Paralympic archers of Italy
Paralympic silver medalists for Italy
Paralympic medalists in archery
Archers at the 2020 Summer Paralympics
Medalists at the 2020 Summer Paralympics
Paralympic athletes of Fiamme Azzurre
Sportspeople from Milan